Sokolovac may refer to:

Sokolovac, Bjelovar-Bilogora County, village in the municipality of Dežanovac in Croatia 
Sokolovac, Koprivnica-Križevci County, village and municipality in Croatia 
Sokolovac, Osijek-Baranja County, village in the municipality of Kneževi Vinogradi in Croatia
Socol, known in Serbo-Croatian as Sokolovac, in Romania

See also
Sokolovići (disambiguation)
Sokolović, surname
Sokolić, surname
Sokolovo (disambiguation)
Sokolov (disambiguation)
Sokol (disambiguation)
Sokol (disambiguation)